Mishmish or Mish-Mish or variation, may refer to:

 Mish Mish, Akkar District, Akkar Governorate, Lebanon
 Mish Mish, Byblos District, Keserwan-Jbeil Governorate, Lebanon
 Egyptian Communist Organisation (al-Munaẓẓamah aš-Šiūʿīah al-Miṣriyyah, ; abbreviated Mishmish)
 Mujahideen Shura Council (Syria) (Majlis Shūrā Mujāhidīn ash-Sharqīyah, ; abbreviated Mishmish)

See also

 Mishmish Effenfi, a cartoon created by the Frenkel brothers
 Mish (disambiguation)
 Mich Mich (disambiguation)
 Mish Mash (disambiguation)